Museum of the Slovak National Uprising is a museum in Banská Bystrica that commemorates the Slovak National Uprising, an antifascist revolt during World War II. The museum documents the history of the Slovak state 1939-1945 and the Slovak National Uprising aimed against the Slovak government which collaborated with Nazi Germany. The Slovak National Uprising was not an insurgency but an organized military effort by the Allied recognised resistance army - The 1st Czechoslovak army in Slovakia. The Slovak National Uprising (Slovak: Slovenské národné povstanie, abbreviated SNP) was a military uprising organized by the Slovak resistance movement during World War II. This resistance movement was represented mainly by the members of the Democratic Party, but also by social democrats and Communists, albeit on a smaller scale. It was launched on 29 August 1944 from Banská Bystrica in an attempt to resist German troops that had occupied Slovak territory and to overthrow the collaborationist government of Jozef Tiso. Although the resistance was largely defeated by German forces, guerrilla operations continued until the Red Army, Czechoslovak Army and Romanian Army occupied the Slovak Republic in 1945.

References

External links

 (Slovak)

Museums in Slovakia
Slovak National Uprising